The 2009 Tango Masters of Formula 3 was the nineteenth Masters of Formula 3 race held at Circuit Park Zandvoort on 14 June 2009. The race returned to Zandvoort after a two-year stay at Zolder. It was won by Masters debutant Valtteri Bottas, for ART Grand Prix.

Drivers and teams
All drivers used Dallara F308 chassis, excepting Stefano Coletti, who used F309 model.

Classification

Qualifying 1
Group A drivers are highlighted in green.

Odd numbers

Even numbers

Qualifying 2

Group A

Group B

Starting grid

Race

References

Masters of Formula Three
Masters
Masters
Masters of Formula Three